Liracraea is a genus of sea snails, marine gastropod mollusks in the family Mangeliidae.

Species
Species within the genus Liracraea include:
 † Liracraea dictyota (Hutton, 1885) 
 Liracraea epentroma (Murdoch, 1905)
 Liracraea odhneri Powell, 1942
 † Liracraea opimacosta Richardson, 1997 
 Liracraea otakauica Powell, 1942
 † Liracraea titirangiensis Marwick, 1928

References

External links
 Bouchet, P.; Kantor, Y. I.; Sysoev, A.; Puillandre, N. (2011). A new operational classification of the Conoidea. Journal of Molluscan Studies. 77, 273-308
  Tucker, J.K. 2004 Catalog of recent and fossil turrids (Mollusca: Gastropoda). Zootaxa 682:1-1295.
 Worldwide Mollusk Data base : Mangeliidae

 
Gastropod genera